Jelle de Louw (born 23 July 1997) is a Dutch football player who last played for FC Den Bosch.

Club career
He made his professional debut in the Eerste Divisie for FC Den Bosch on 8 May 2015 in a game against Almere City FC.

References

External links
 
 

1997 births
People from Sint-Oedenrode
Living people
Dutch footballers
FC Den Bosch players
Eerste Divisie players
Association football midfielders
Footballers from North Brabant